Gradual emancipation was a legal mechanism used by some states to abolish slavery over a period of time, such as An Act for the Gradual Abolition of Slavery of 1780 in Pennsylvania.

History
In the 16th century, Bartolomé de las Casas advocated ending enslavement. He stated that it was immoral, but there was pressure economically and politically to maintain slavery. Some of those who advocated for change wanted to end the transatlantic slave trade, because of how tortuous it was, but still supported slavery. Others wanted to end slavery entirely.

The Age of Enlightenment of the late 17th century influenced increasing support for emancipation in the 18th century. In the 1770s, Black people throughout New England began sending petitions to northern legislatures demanding freedom. 
Pennsylvania's An Act for the Gradual Abolition of Slavery of 1780 was the first legislative enactment in the United States. It specified that

Once the Pennsylvania residents were freed, they were supposed to be treated the same as indentured servants who were contracted for four years of service. For instance, they were to receive tools of their trade or other privileges.

Four other Northern self-declared states adopted policies to at least gradually abolish slavery: New Hampshire and Massachusetts in 1783, and Connecticut and Rhode Island in 1784. The Republic of Vermont had already limited slavery in its original constitution (1777), before it joined the United States as the 14th state in 1791. These state jurisdictions thus enacted the first abolition laws in the Americas. By 1808, the importation of enslaved people was prohibited (though smuggling continued), and by the 1820s all Northern states enacted laws for either gradual or immediate emancipation.

Abraham Lincoln proposed an amendment to the Constitution for gradual emancipation in 1861 and 1862, culminating with the Second Message to Congress in December 1862. However, he realized that immediate emancipation was what was needed, because there was increasing support for emancipation in the north and slaves helped the Confederates during the war. This led to the Emancipation Proclamation, which was formalized on January 1, 1863. The Thirteenth Amendment to the United States Constitution was ratified at the end of the war, making slavery illegal in every state, and all enslaved people were freed.

See also
 Back-to-Africa movement, forced colonization
 Compensated emancipation
 Slave states and free states
 Timeline of abolition of slavery and serfdom
 Timeline of events leading to the American Civil War

References

Abolitionism in the United States
Pre-emancipation African-American history
African-American documents
Legal history of the United States
United States slavery law